Curry and Chips is a British television sitcom broadcast in 1969 which was produced by London Weekend Television for the ITV network.

Set on a factory floor of 'Lillicrap Ltd', it starred a browned up Spike Milligan as an Irishman of Pakistani heritage named Kevin O'Grady, who also featured in episode 7 of the fifth series of Speight's Till Death Us Do Part. It also featured Eric Sykes as the foreman, Norman Rossington as the shop steward, and other regulars were Kenny Lynch, and Sam Kydd. The series was written by Till Death Us Do Part writer Johnny Speight, but based on an idea by Milligan. The programme was cancelled for what some (including the ITA) considered racist humour.

It was the first LWT sitcom to be broadcast in its entirety in colour, and all episodes still exist.

Controversy

The ambition of Curry and Chips was purportedly to highlight discrimination, rather than promote it. The Independent Television Authority disagreed, and Curry and Chips was cancelled by them after only six episodes. Speight himself later remarked, "It was the English who were made to look bigoted in the show but the people at the ITA couldn't understand that. It was London Weekend Television's first year, but only six shows went out. The ITA made LWT take it off, saying it was racist." They were not alone, as amongst those who originally complained about the show were the Race Relations Board.

Screenonline says of the show, "though it again attempted to raise important questions, [it] lacked a strong enough voice to challenge the racist attitudes of its characters, and too much of its humour relied on the use of crude racial abuse and Milligan's caricatured performance as the charmlessly-nicknamed 'Paki Paddy'. The shocked reaction from some viewers and cultural commentators led to the show being dropped by ITV after just six episodes, and in retrospect it is hard to understand how Speight and LWT can have failed to anticipate the offence it caused."

The show was also controversial for the number of swear words in it. The word 'bloody' was used 59 times in one episode, although Eric Sykes refused to swear until doing so, once, in the final episode.

Six years later, Milligan once again blacked up in the BBC series The Melting Pot. Only one episode was shown, and the other five were pulled.

DVD release
Curry and Chips – The Complete Series was released on 19 April 2010 by Network. Catalogue Number 7953165.

References

External links

1969 British television series debuts
1969 British television series endings
1960s British sitcoms
1960s British workplace comedy television series
English-language television shows
ITV sitcoms
London Weekend Television shows
Race-related controversies in the United Kingdom
Race-related controversies in television
Television controversies in the United Kingdom
Ethnic humour
Stereotypes of South Asian people